Leon Evans (born October 1, 1961) is an American former NFL defensive end who played for the Detroit Lions from 1985 to 1986 for a total of 24 career games.

References

1961 births
Living people
American football defensive ends
Detroit Lions players
People from Silver Spring, Maryland
Miami Hurricanes football players